The 2003–04 season was Chelsea F.C.'s, 12th consecutive season in the Premier League and 98th year as a club. Manager Claudio Ranieri was sacked on 31 May 2004 and was replaced by José Mourinho. In July 2003, long-time chairman Ken Bates sold the club to Russian billionaire Roman Abramovich.

Chelsea finished second to the unbeaten Arsenal in the Premier League. In the Champions League Chelsea reached the semi-finals against AS Monaco, but failed to reach the final, losing 5–3 on aggregate to the French side. They also exited the FA Cup in the fifth round to Arsenal and the Carling Cup in the quarter-finals to Aston Villa.

Team kit
The team kit was produced by Umbro. The shirt sponsor was Emirates Airline; the kit bore the "Fly Emirates" logo. Chelsea's home kit was all blue with a white collar. Their new away kit was all white with black and blue stripes down the center. Last season's away kit (all black with blue accents) was retained as the club's third kit.

First team squad
Squad at end of season

Reserve squad

Transfers

In

Out

Overall transfer activity

Total Spending
Summer:  £111,150,000

Winter:  £10,000,000

Total:  £121,150,000

Income
Summer:  £500,000

Winter:  £0

Total:  £500,000

Expenditure
Summer:  £110,650,000

Winter:  £10,000,000

Total:  £120,650,000

Competitions

Premier League

League table

Results summary

Matches

UEFA Champions League

Third qualifying round

Group stage

Knockout phase

Round of 16

Quarter-finals

Semi-finals

FA Cup

League Cup

Statistics

|}

References

External links
 Chelsea FC Official Website
 Chelsea FC on Soccerbase
 Chelsea FC on BBC
 Mark Worrall Official Website

Chelsea F.C. seasons
Chelsea